Peter Daland (April 12, 1921 – October 20, 2014) was a swimming coach from the United States. 

He was born in New York City. His coaching career spanned over 40 years. Daland attended Harvard University before enlisting in the United States Army for World War II. After the war, he graduated from Swarthmore College in 1948 and got his first coaching job at Rose Valley, Pennsylvania, where he won 8 straight Suburban League titles (1947–55).  He founded and was first coach of the Suburban Swim Club in Newtown Square, Pennsylvania and served as an assistant to Bob Kiphuth at Yale University before deciding to take Horace Greeley's advice and head west in 1956 as coach at the University of Southern California in Los Angeles and the Los Angeles Athletic Club.  In 1958, he returned to Yale with 5 USC Freshmen and won the National AAU Team Title from the New Haven Swim Club. 

For 35 years (1957–1992), Daland was the swimming coach for the USC Trojans, where he led the Trojans to 9 NCAA Championships. He also led teams to 14 AAU Men's National titles, and 2 AAU Women's National titles.  He is the only coach to have won all three major national team championships -- 8 NCAA, 14 National AAU Men's, and 2 National AAU Women's (LAAC).  Specializing in family dynasties, Daland had the good fortune of championships wins from the brothers Devine, Bottoms, Furniss, Orr, and the House brother and sister act.  His Trojan teams won more than 160 dual meets with more than 100 individual titles.  As of 1974, Daland's record boasted 183 individual national champions. 

Daland also coached the U.S. women's swim team at the 1964 Olympics, where his swimmers won 15 of the 24 medals awarded in women's swim events.  He then coached the US men's team at the 1972 Olympics, where his men swimmers won 26 of 45 medals awarded in men's events.  In those Olympics,  Mark Spitz of the United States had a spectacular run, lining up for seven events, winning seven Olympic titles and setting seven world records. 

Daland was also active in the swimming community via his roles/positions with FISU, the International University Sports Federation, and ASCA, the American Swimming Coaches Association.  He was one of the founders of ASCA, and was inducted into the International Swimming Hall of Fame in 1977.  The pool of USC's Uytengsu Aquatics Center bears his name. 

Daland was married to former German top-class swimmer Ingrid Feuerstack. They had three children, Peter Jr., Bonnie, and Leslie. Leslie now owns Daland Swim School, which was founded by Ingrid, in Thousand Oaks, California. Leslie's daughter, Reyna, is currently a student at the University of Southern California and is employed at the Daland Swim School. On October 20, 2014, he died in Thousand Oaks, California at the age of 93 of Alzheimer's disease.

Honors and awards
1962 ASCA Coach of the Year
1964 Olympics Women's Swimming Team Coach for the USA
1972 Olympics Men's Swimming Head Coach for the USA
1977 AAU Swimming Award recipient

See also
 List of members of the International Swimming Hall of Fame

References

External links
 
 

American swimming coaches
USC Trojans swimming coaches
2014 deaths
1921 births
Sportspeople from New York City
Harvard University alumni
United States Army personnel of World War II
Yale Bulldogs swimming coaches
Swarthmore College alumni
Deaths from Alzheimer's disease
Deaths from dementia in California